Lawsonville is an unincorporated community in Stokes County, North Carolina, United States, approximately ten miles north-northwest of the county seat of Danbury, on North Carolina State Highway 8.

Unincorporated communities in Stokes County, North Carolina
Unincorporated communities in North Carolina